The 1884 Yale Bulldogs football team represented Yale University in the 1884 college football season. The team compiled an 8–0–1 record, shut out eight of nine opponents, and outscored all opponents, 495 to 10. The team was retroactively named as the national champion by the Helms Athletic Foundation and National Championship Foundation and as a co-national champion by Parke H. Davis.

Schedule

Roster
 Rushers: F. W. Wallace, Samuel Reading Bertron, H. R. Flanders, F. G. Peters, A. B. Coxe, R. Ronalds, W. N. Goodwin, Sheffield, L. F. Robinson, R. S. Storrs
 Quarterback: T. L. Bayne
 Halfbacks: Eugene Lamb Richards, Wyllys Terry
 Back: M. H. Marlin

References

Yale
Yale Bulldogs football seasons
College football national champions
College football undefeated seasons
Yale Bulldogs football